Jorge Henão (born 13 September 1967) is a former Venezuelan swimmer who competed in the 1984 Summer Olympics.

References

1962 births
Living people
Venezuelan male swimmers
Male breaststroke swimmers
Olympic swimmers of Venezuela
Swimmers at the 1984 Summer Olympics
Competitors at the 1986 Central American and Caribbean Games
Central American and Caribbean Games gold medalists for Venezuela
Central American and Caribbean Games medalists in swimming
20th-century Venezuelan people
21st-century Venezuelan people